The poetry of Gaius Valerius Catullus was written towards the end of the Roman Republic. It describes the lifestyle of the poet and his friends, as well as, most famously, his love for the woman he calls Lesbia.

Sources and organization

Catullus's poems have been preserved in three manuscripts that were copied from one of two copies made from a lost manuscript discovered around 1300. These three surviving manuscript copies are stored at the Bibliothèque Nationale in Paris, the Bodleian Library at Oxford, and the Vatican Library in Rome.  These manuscripts contained approximately 116 of Catullus's carmina. However, a few fragments quoted by later Roman editors but not found in the manuscripts show that there are some additional poems that have been lost. There is no scholarly consensus on whether Catullus himself arranged the order of the poems.

While the numbering of the poems up to 116 has been retained, three of these poems—18, 19 and 20—are excluded from most modern editions because they are now considered not to be Catullan, having been added by Muretus in his 1554 edition (which identified 113 poems existing in the Catullan manuscripts). Some modern editors (and commentators),  however, retain Poem 18 as genuine Catullan. Furthermore, some editors have considered that, in some cases, two poems have been brought together by previous editors, and, by dividing these, add 2B, 14B, 58B, 68B and 78B as separate poems. Not all editors agree with these divisions, especially with regard to Poem 68.

Catullus's carmina can be divided into three formal parts: short poems in varying metres, called polymetra (1–60); eight longer poems (61–68); and forty-eight epigrams (69–116). The longer poems differ from the polymetra and the epigrams not only in length but also in their subjects: there are seven hymns and one mini-epic, or epyllion, the most highly prized form for the "new poets". 

The polymetra and the epigrams can be divided into four major thematic groups (ignoring a rather large number of poems eluding such categorization):

 poems to and about his friends (e.g., an invitation such as Poem 13).
 erotic poems: some of them indicate homosexual penchants (48, 50, and 99), but most are about women, especially about one he calls "Lesbia" (in honour of the poet Sappho of Lesbos, source and inspiration of many of his poems); philologists have gone to considerable efforts to discover her real identity, and many have concluded that Lesbia was Clodia, sister of the infamous Publius Clodius Pulcher and a woman known for her generous sexuality, but this identification rests on some rather fragile assumptions. Catullus displays a wide range of highly emotional and seemingly contradictory responses to Lesbia, ranging from tender love poems to sadness, disappointment, and bitter sarcasm.
 invectives: some of these often rude and sometimes downright obscene poems are targeted at friends-turned-traitors (e.g., Poem 16) and other lovers of Lesbia, but many well-known poets, politicians (e.g. Julius Caesar) and orators, including Cicero, are thrashed as well. However, many of these poems are humorous and craftily veil the sting of the attack. For example, Catullus writes a poem mocking a pretentious descendant of a freedman who emphasizes the letter "h" in his speech because it makes him sound more like a learned Greek by adding unnecessary Hs to words like insidias (ambush).
 condolences: some poems of Catullus are, in fact, serious in nature. One poem, 96, comforts a friend for the death of his wife, while several others, most famously 101, lament the death of his brother.

All these poems describe the lifestyle of Catullus and his friends, who, despite Catullus's temporary political post in Bithynia, appear to have lived withdrawn from politics. They were interested mainly in poetry and love. Above all other qualities, Catullus seems to have sought venustas (attractiveness, beauty) and lepos (charm).  The ancient Roman concept of virtus (i.e. of virtue that had to be proved by a political or military career), which Cicero suggested as the solution to the societal problems of the late Republic, are interrogated in Catullus.

But it is not the traditional notions Catullus rejects, merely their monopolized application to the active life of politics and war. Indeed, he tries to reinvent these notions from a personal point of view and to introduce them into human relationships. For example, he applies the word fides, which traditionally meant faithfulness towards one's political allies, to his relationship with Lesbia and reinterprets it as unconditional faithfulness in love. So, despite the seeming frivolity of his lifestyle, Catullus measured himself and his friends by quite ambitious standards.

Catullus is the predecessor in Roman elegy for poets like Propertius, Tibullus, and Ovid. Catullus's focus in his poetry is on himself, the male lover. He writes obsessively about Lesbia; however she is just an object to him. In his writing, the male lover is the important character, and Lesbia is part of his theatrical passion. Catullus's love-poetry offers a superb example of why it is not enough in love to focus exclusively on one's own feelings. It is important to note Catullus came at the beginning of this genre, so his work is much different than his predecessors. Ovid is heavily influenced by Catullus; however, he switches the focus of his writing to the concept of love and Amor, rather than himself or the male lover. This opposing views begin to shape the different types of love and controversies in Roman elegiac poetry.

Inspirations
 Catullus deeply admired Sappho and Callimachus.  Poem 66 is a quite faithful translation of Callimachus' poem Βερενίκης Πλόκαμος ("Berenice's Braid", Aetia fr. 110 Pfeiffer) and he adapted one of his epigrams, on the lover Callignotus who broke his promise to Ionis in favor of a boy (Ep. 11 Gow-Page) into poem 70. Poem 51, on the other hand, is an adaption and re-imagining of Sappho 31. Poems 51 and 11 are the only poems of Catullus written in the meter of Sapphic strophe, and may be respectively his first and last poems to Lesbia.   He was also inspired by the corruption of Julius Caesar, Pompey, and the other aristocrats of his time.

Influence

Catullus was a popular poet in the Renaissance and a central model for the neo-Latin love elegy. By 1347 Petrarch was an admirer and imitator who read the ancient poet in the Verona codex (the "V" manuscript). Catullus also influenced other humanist poets, including Panormita, Pontano, and Marullus.

Catullus influenced many English poets, including Andrew Marvell and Robert Herrick. Ben Jonson and Christopher Marlowe wrote imitations of his shorter poems, particularly Catullus 5, and John Milton wrote of the poet's "Satyirical sharpness, or naked plainness."

He has been praised as a lyricist and translated by writers including Thomas Campion, William Wordsworth, James Methven, and Louis Zukofsky.

Poems 5, 8, 32, 41, 51, 58, 70, 73, 75, 85, 87 and 109 were set to music by Carl Orff as part of his Catulli Carmina.

Style

Catullus wrote in many different meters including hendecasyllabic and elegiac couplets (common in love poetry). A portion of his poetry (roughly a fourth) shows strong and occasionally wild emotions especially in regard to Lesbia. He also demonstrates a great sense of humour such as in Catullus 13 and 42.

Many of the literary techniques he used are still common today, including hyperbole: plenus sacculus est aranearum (Catullus 13), which translates as ‘[my] purse is all full – of cobwebs.’ He also uses anaphora e.g. Salve, nec minimo puella naso nec bello pede nec…(Catullus 43) as well as tricolon and alliteration. He is also very fond of diminutives such as in Catullus 50: Hesterno, Licini, die otiose/multum lusimus in meis tabellis – Yesterday, Licinius, was a day of leisure/ playing many games in my little note books.

History of the texts of Catullus's poems
Far more than for major Classical poets such as Virgil and Horace, the texts of Catullus's poems are in a corrupted condition, with omissions and disputable word choices present in many of the poems, making textual analysis and even conjectural changes important in the study of his poems.

A single book of poems by Catullus barely survived the millennia, and the texts of a great many of the poems are considered corrupted to one extent or another from hand transmission of manuscript to manuscript. Even an early scribe, of the manuscript G, lamented the poor condition of the source and announced to readers that he was not to blame:

Even in the twentieth century, not all major manuscripts were known to all major scholars (or at least the importance of all of the major manuscripts was not recognized), and some important scholarly works on Catullus don't refer to them.

Before the fourteenth century

In the Middle Ages, Catullus appears to have been barely known. In one of the few references to his poetry, Isidore of Seville quotes from the poet in the seventh century. In 966 Bishop Rather of Verona, the poet's hometown, discovered a manuscript of his poems "and reproached himself for spending day and night with Catullus's poetry." No more information on any Catullus manuscript is known again until about 1300.

Major source manuscripts up to the fourteenth century

A small number of manuscripts were the main vehicles for preserving Catullus's poems, known by these capital-letter names. Other, minor source manuscripts are designated with lower-case letters.

In summary, these are the relationships of major Catullus manuscripts:
 The V manuscript spawned A, which spawned O and X. The X manuscript then spawned G and R, and T is some kind of distant relative.
 O, G, R, and T are known exactly, but V is lost, and we have no direct knowledge of A and X, which are deduced by scholars.

Descriptions and history of the major source manuscripts

T – ninth-century – contains only Poem 62.
V – nothing is known about its creation date, except that it was certainly written in a minuscule script; it became known in the late 13th or early 14th century – a manuscript preserved in the Chapter Library of Verona and also known as the Verona Codex, is said to have been "clearly available to various Paduan and Veronese humanists in the period 1290 – 1310". Benvenuto de Campesanis "celebrated the discovery as the poet's resurrection from the dead". This manuscript is now lost. V was the sole source of nearly all of the poet's surviving work. It was a "late and corrupt copy which was already the despair of its earliest scribes." Many scholars think this manuscript spawned manuscripts O, X, G, and R.
A – a scholar-deduced intermediate source of the O and X manuscripts. If it existed, it could date from the late 13th to sometime in the 14th century – created from V soon after V was discovered in Verona. Its (disputable) existence is deduced from the titles and divisions of the poems of the O, X, G, and R manuscripts.
O – last third of the fourteenth century. It is most probably the oldest of all known MSS. containing the entire Catullan corpus (T is five hundred years older, but it contains only one poem). Its importance was not presented to the public until R. Ellis brought out Catulli Veronensis Liber in 1867 (Oxford).
X – last quarter of the fourteenth century. This manuscript is lost; scholars deduced its existence as a direct source of the later G and R manuscripts. Contrary to the disputable existence of A, the existence of X is not doubted.
G – last quarter of the fourteenth century. G and R are two manuscripts with close textual "proximity" that "make it clear that these two descend together" from a common source (X). G bears a date of 19 October 1375 in its subscription, but there is a prevailing opinion of scholars that this date (and the entire subscription) has been copied from X.
R – in about 1391, the X manuscript was copied for the humanist Coluccio Salutati, the chancellor of Florence. This copy is the R manuscript. Coluccio added some important marginal readings, now called "R2". Some of this material comes from the X manuscript because it is also present in G. The R manuscript, lost through an error in cataloguing, was dramatically rediscovered in a dusty corner of the Vatican Library by the American scholar William Gardner Hale in 1896. It helped form the basis of Ellis's Oxford Classical Text of Catullus in 1904, but didn't receive wide recognition until 1970, when it was printed in a facsimile edition by D.F.S. Thompson: The Codex Romanus of Catullus: A Collation of the Text (RhM 113: 97–110).

In print

The text was first printed in Venice by printer Wendelin von Speyer in 1472. There were many manuscripts in circulation by this time. A second printed edition appeared the following year in Parma by Francesco Puteolano, who stated that he had made extensive corrections to the previous edition.

Over the next hundred years, Poliziano, Scaliger and other humanists worked on the text and "dramatically improved" it, according to Stephen J. Harrison: "the apparatus criticus of any modern edition bears eloquent witness to the activities of these fifteenth and sixteenth-century scholars."

The divisions of poems gradually approached something very close to the modern divisions, especially with the 1577 edition of Joseph J. Scaliger, Catulli Properti Tibulli nova editio (Paris).

"Sixteenth-century Paris was an especially lively center of Catullan scholarship," one Catullus scholar has written. Scaliger's edition took a "novel approach to textual criticism. Scaliger argued that all Catullus manuscripts descended from a single, lost archetype. ... His attempt to reconstruct the characteristics of the lost archetype was also highly original. [...] [I]n the tradition of classical philology, there was no precedent for so detailed an effort at reconstruction of a lost witness."

In 1876, Emil Baehrens brought out the first version of his edition, Catulli Veronensis Liber (two volumes; Leipzig), which contained the text from G and O alone, with a number of emendations.

In the twentieth century

The 1949 Oxford Classical Text by R.A.B. Mynors, partly because of its wide availability, has become the standard text, at least in the English-speaking world.

One very influential article in Catullus scholarship, R.G.M. Nisbet's "Notes on the text and interpretation of Catullus" (available in Nisbet's Collected Papers on Latin Literature, Oxford, 1995), gave Nisbet's own conjectural solutions to more than 20 problematic passages of the poems. He also revived a number of older conjectures, going as far back as Renaissance scholarship, which editors had ignored.

Another influential text of Catullus poems is that of George P. Goold, Catullus (London, 1983).

Readings

See also 

 Codex Vaticanus Ottobonianus Latinus 1829

Notes

References
Oxford Latin Reader, by Maurice Balme and James Morwood (1997)

Collections and commentaries

External links
 
 
 Poems of Catullus at Project Gutenberg
 Catullus's work in Latin and over 25 other languages at Catullus Translations
 Find other Catullus-minded people and discuss his works with them at the Catullus Forum
 The complete poems of Catullus at The Latin Library
 Summer Lyrics Short essay on Catullus by Morgan Meis of 3 Quarks Daily
 Poems of Catullus in Latin/English 
 CATULLUS PURIFIED: A BRIEF HISTORY OF CARMEN 16
 Catullus: text, concordances, and frequency list

 
Catullus, Poetry
Catullus
LGBT poetry
Articles containing video clips